Caroline Asenath Grant Burghardt (June 10, 1834 – February 6, 1922) was a Union nurse during the American Civil War, who later practiced a medical doctor in Washington D.C.

Early life 
Burghardt was born in Great Barrington, Massachusetts, the daughter of John Budd Burghardt and Asenath Lucinda Grant. Her mother died when Caroline was a girl. She was working as a governess in New York at the outbreak of the Civil War. Poet and journalist William Cullen Bryant was an acquaintance of Burghardt's, and may have helped place her in a nursing role during the war.

War service 
On April 19, 1861, Burghardt reported to Bellevue Hospital where she was accepted for nurse training by the board of surgeons. Her training lasted until June 8, 1861, when she traveled to Washington to begin acting as a nurse in the war. Burghardt served as a nurse until September 6, 1865. She was stationed at numerous locations, such as Antietam, Gettysburg, Fortress Monroe, Winchester, and Alexandria. After Burghardt's service ended, Dorothea Dix composed a "testimony of hospital services" regarding Burghardt's work during the war. In this letter, Dix commented on Burghardt's "superior fidelity and skill."

Career after the war 
Burghardt continued her medical career well after the Civil War ended. In 1872, when she was 42 years old, Burghardt graduated from the medical school at Howard University. Afterwards, she practiced homeopathic medicine and began her own medical practice in Washington, D.C. She also held positions in the Treasury Department, the Commerce Department, and the Bureau of Navigation. She served a term as President of the Civil War Nurses' Association, and made appearances at Civil War commemorative events into the 1900s.

Personal life 
Burghardt received a pension of twelve dollars a month after February 28, 1891. She died in 1922, aged 87 years, in Washington D.C. Her grave is in Arlington National Cemetery.

References

External links 

 

Women in the American Civil War
People from Great Barrington, Massachusetts
American Civil War nurses
American women nurses
Howard University alumni
American physicians
1834 births
1922 deaths